P. monstrosus may refer to:
 Paraharmochirus monstrosus, a jumping spider species
 Poltys monstrosus, an orb-weaverspider species in the genus Poltys

See also
 Monstrosus (disambiguation)